Bryan Rennie (born 1954) is a British historian of religions, the Vira I. Heinz Professor of Religion at Westminster College in New Wilmington, Pennsylvania. Known for his works on Romanian scholar Mircea Eliade, Rennie was awarded the Mircea Eliade Centennial Jubilee Medal for contributions to the History of Religions by then-President Traian Băsescu in 2006.

References
Official website

1954 births
Living people
21st-century American historians
21st-century American male writers
Academics from Pennsylvania
Alumni of the University of Edinburgh
American male non-fiction writers
Scottish emigrants to the United States
Westminster College (Pennsylvania) faculty